The  is a major rapid transit system in the Osaka Metropolitan Area of Japan, operated by the Osaka Metro Company, Ltd. It serves the city of Osaka and the adjacent municipalities of Higashiosaka, Kadoma, Moriguchi, Sakai, Suita, and Yao. Osaka Metro forms an integral part of the extensive mass transit system of Greater Osaka (part of the Kansai region), having 123 out of the 1,108 rail stations (2007) in the Osaka-Kobe-Kyoto region. In 2010, the greater Osaka region had 13 million rail passengers daily (see Transport in Keihanshin) of which the Osaka Municipal Subway (as it was then known) accounted for 2.29 million.

Osaka Metro is the only subway system in Japan to be legally classified as a tramway, whereas all other subway systems in Japan are legally classified as railways. Despite this, it has characteristics typical of a full-fledged metro system.

Overview
As a north–south trunk route, it is the oldest and busiest line in the whole network. Both it and the main east–west route, the Chūō Line, were later extended to the north and east, respectively. These extensions are owned by other railway companies, but both Osaka Metro and these private operators run their own set of trains through between the two sections.

All but one of the remaining lines of the network, including the Yotsubashi Line, Tanimachi Line, and Sennichimae Line, are completely independent lines with no through services. The lone exception is the Sakaisuji Line, which operates through trains to existing Hankyu Railway lines and is the only line to operate through services to existing railway lines that are not isolated from the national rail network (which is the case with the Midōsuji and Chūō Lines).

Nearly all stations have a letter number combination, the letter identifying the line served by the station and the number indicating the relative location of the station on the line. For example, Higobashi Station on the Yotsubashi Line is also known as Y12. This combination is heard in bilingual Japanese-English automated next-station announcements on board all trains, which also provide information on local businesses near the station. Only Hankyu stations served by the Sakaisuji Line do not follow this convention.

Management

A proposal to corporatize the Osaka subway was sent to the city government in February 2013 and was given final approval in 2017. The rationale behind corporatization is that it would bring private investors to Osaka and could help revive Osaka's economy. The Osaka Metro Co. was incorporated on June 1, 2017, and took over operations on April 1, 2018.

The Osaka Metro Co. also operates all city buses in Osaka, through its majority-owned subsidiary, the Osaka City Bus Corporation.

Branding
Osaka Metro stations are denoted by the Osaka Metro Co.'s corporate logo, a white-on-dark-blue icon placed at ground-level entrances, depicting an "M" (for "Metro") based on a coiled ribbon, which would form an "O" (for "Osaka") when viewed from the side, with the "Osaka Metro" wordmark set in the Gotham typeface. "Osaka Metro" (in Latin characters) is the official branding in Japanese, and is always represented as such in official media. (News outlets have been seen to use 大阪メトロ, presumably to better flow with article text.) Individual lines are represented by a public-facing name (e.g. “Midōsuji Line” for Line No. 1) and a specific color, as well as a single Latin letter, which is paired with a different number at each station for easy identification (see below). Icons for each line (featured in station wayfinding signage) are represented by a solid roundel in the line color, superimposed with the line's letter-designation in the Parisine typeface.

This mark is still present on newer trainsets and staff uniforms as the mark is Osaka Metro's corporate emblem, as well as a connection to the subway network's roots.

When it was run by the Osaka Municipal Transportation Bureau, the subway used a logo known as the  symbol, which is a katakana  for  superimposed over a circular capital “O” for “Osaka” (see infobox, above). This remains on many trainsets and at stations, but is slated for replacement with the Osaka Metro logo as the changeover progresses.

Lines

Table notes

Planned line and extensions

In addition, there are five line extensions and one new line that are planned. However, on August 28, 2014, the Osaka Municipal Transportation Bureau met about creating the extensions of the later five of the six lines listed below, and have stated considering the current cost of the new extensions (and the possibly of privatization at the time), the government has also considered using light rail transit or bus rapid transit instead. Osaka Metro is now experimenting with bus rapid transit on the route of the Imazatosuji Line extension, with “Imazato Liner” service between Imazato and Yuzato-Rokuchōme slated to begin in April 2019.

With Osaka being the host of Expo 2025, there are also plans to extend the Chuo Line northwest onto Yumeshima (the event's planned site), with a terminus on Sakura-jima north of Universal Studios Japan. Provisions were put in place for such an extension when the existing road tunnel between Cosmosquare and Yumeshima was built, but the current state of the artificial island (with only industrial facilities and a lone convenience store for workers) meant it would have been unlikely to proceed had Osaka lost its bid.

Technology and rolling stock 
Osaka Municipal Subway rolling stock use two types of propulsion systems. The vast majority of lines use trains with conventional electric motors, but the two newest lines, the Nagahori Tsurumi-ryokuchi Line and Imazatosuji Line, use linear motor-powered trains, which allow them to use smaller trains and tunnels, reducing construction costs. These two lines have half-height automatic platform gates installed at all station platforms, as does the Sennichimae Line and Midosuji Line (completed in 2022).

Also, unlike other rapid transit networks in Japan, most Osaka subway lines use a third rail electrification system for trains. Only three lines use overhead catenary: the Sakaisuji Line, to accommodate through services on Hankyu trackage; and the linear-motor Nagahori Tsurumi-ryokuchi and Imazatosuji Lines. Also unusually, all lines use standard gauge; there are no narrow gauge sections of track due to the network being almost entirely self-enclosed.

Conventional motored
 10 series: Midōsuji Line [withdraw since July 2022]
 20 series: Chūō Line
 21 series ("New 20 series"): Midōsuji Line
 22 series ("New 20 series"): Tanimachi Line
 23 series ("New 20 series"): Yotsubashi Line
 24 series ("New 20 series"): Chūō Line (A variant of the 24 series is used on the Chūō Line in Osaka Port Transport System livery.)
 25 series ("New 20 series"): Sennichimae Line
 66 series: Sakaisuji Line
 30000 series: Tanimachi Line, Midōsuji Line, Chūō Line (30000A series)

Linear motored
 70 series: Nagahori Tsurumi-ryokuchi Line
 80 series: Imazatosuji Line

Fares

Osaka Metro charges five types of fares for single rides, based on the distance traveled in each journey. Some discount fares exist.

Incidents
On April 8, 1970, a gas explosion occurred during the construction of the Tanimachi Line at Tenjimbashisuji Rokuchōme Station, killing 79 people and injuring 420.

Network Map

See also
 Transport in Keihanshin
 List of Osaka Metro stations
 List of metro systems

References

External links

 Osaka Metro official site (English)
 Osaka Metro route map (PDF)

 

Underground rapid transit in Japan
750 V DC railway electrification
1500 V DC railway electrification